The Bristol underground scene a cultural movement in Bristol beginning in the early 1980s. The scene was born out of a lack of mainstream clubs catering for the emergence of hip hop music, with street and underground parties a mainstay. Crews formed playing hip hop in disused venues with sound systems borrowed from the reggae scene: City Rockers, 2 Bad, 2 Tuff, KC Rock, UD4, FBI, Dirty Den, Juice Crew, Rene & Bacus, Soul Twins, KC Rock, Fresh 4, and The Wild Bunch were among them. These names were the precursors to the more well known names that came from this scene. It is characterized by musicians and graffiti artists. The scene was influenced by the city's multiculturalism, political activism, and the arts movements of punk, reggae, hip hop, hippies and new age.

Bristol has been particularly associated with the music genre trip hop.

The Bristol scene has a strong relationship between music and visual art, particularly graffiti art. A founding member of the band Massive Attack, Robert Del Naja, originally a graffiti artist, and local graffiti artist Banksy, have gone on to produce album covers and artworks. Inkie, collaborator alongside Banksy, also took part in Bristol's counter-culture scene.

History 
The original music scene of Bristol was influenced by many Caribbean immigrants who had made Bristol their home, and the punk movement.

The city of Bristol was beginning to form a sound system culture in the late 1970s, with regular impoundings of music equipment by police. Due to rising social tensions in the city the 1980 St. Pauls riot after a police raid of the Black and White Café. After the riots the police no longer confiscated music equipment. Music fans began looking towards reggae bands like the Black Roots because of their messages of pacifism in a time of social conflict.

In the early 1980s hip hop culture made its way to Bristol and graffiti artists like Robert Del Naja and Banksy began making graffiti art. In music, The Wild Bunch sound system began playing hip hop, reggae, funk, and Rhythm and blues tracks but with added ambient effects, leading to the development of trip hop music.

Characteristics

Activism 
By definition the underground scene tends to be slightly apart from the mainstream and this is reflected in the politics of some of the artists and musicians associated with it. Robert Del Naja has openly declared his opposition to the Iraq War for example. Del Naja and Banksy have both submitted art works to the War Paint exhibition which showcases anti-war art work.

"Bristol sound" and trip hop 
The Bristol sound was the name given to a number of bands and producers from Bristol, in the late 1980s and early 1990s. The city has been particularly associated with the music genre trip hop. Salon magazine has said that trip hop was spawned in "the bohemian, multi-ethnic city of Bristol, where restlessly inventive DJs had spent years assembling samples of various sounds that were floating around: groove-heavy acid jazz, dub, neo-psychedelia, techno disco music, and the brainy art rap".

The Bristol sound has been described as "possessing a darkness that is uplifting, a joyful melancholy". As a whole, the Bristol sound was characterised by a slow, spaced-out hip hop sound that a number of artists in the early and mid 1990s made synonymous with the city. These artists include Massive Attack, Portishead and Tricky and others such as Way Out West, Smith & Mighty, Up, Bustle and Out, Monk & Canatella, Kosheen, Roni Size, and The Wild Bunch.

Graffiti 

Many graffiti artists work in Bristol, including Banksy, an anonymous, English graffiti artist who designed album covers for bands like Blur and Monk & Canatella. Banksy has produced art work in Barcelona, New York City, Australia, London, San Francisco and the West Bank. He uses his original street art form to promote alternative aspects of politics from those displayed by the mainstream media. Some believe that his graffiti helps to provide a voice for those living in urban environments that could not otherwise express themselves, and that his work is also something which improves the aesthetic quality of urban surroundings. Others disagree, asserting that his work is simply vandalism.

There has long been an interplay between the different music and art scenes in Bristol. Del Naja of the band Massive Attack was initially a graffiti artist, "indeed, his first ever live gig was as a DJ accompanying artwork he had produced in a gallery in Bristol".

Independent media 
Bristol also has a tradition of print media, now best exemplified by The Bristolian and Bristle magazine.

Anarchist Ian Bone's The Bristolian news sheet achieved a regular distribution of several thousand, with its satirical exposés of council and corporate corruption. The Bristolian, "Smiter of the High and Mighty", spawned a radical independent political party that polled 15% in Easton ward in 2003. In October 2005 it came runner up for the national Paul Foot Award for investigative journalism.

The anarchist-oriented Bristle, "fighting talk for Bristol and the South-West", was started in 1997 and had its twentieth issue in 2005. Its pages especially feature subvertising and other urban street art to complement news, views and comments on the local activist scene as well as tackling issues such as drugs, mental health and housing.

The 1970s women's liberation paper Enough was succeeded in the 1990s by the environmental and pagan Greenleaf (edited by George Firsoff), West Country Activist, Kebelian Voice, Planet Easton, the anarcho-feminist Bellow and the present-day punk fanzine Everlong, all of which have been published in Bristol. Move was another Women's Liberation magazine; published by the Gay Women's Group, it continued for a number of years in the late 1970s and early 1980s. It had an international circulation, only selling about a quarter in Bristol throughout its existence.

Bristol based magazines, Trap, and Crack have emerged from the bass music scene, alternative fashion scenes and alternative art scenes, all of which feature a heavy student and post-graduate membership.

Urban radio projects such as the 1980s pirate, Savage Yet Tender, and Electro Magnetic Installation, were more short-lived. Dialect Radio, Bristol's first community internet radio station, is still going and is broadcast over BCFM 93.2fm most weeks, and is available to download over the internet. It is put together by the Bristol Radio Co-op, is run by volunteers on a not-for-profit basis, and covers local arts, music, political issues, and local people of interest.

Racial history 
An article in 2008 in The Telegraph stated that: "Racial matters have always carried a historical resonance in Bristol, a city made affluent on the profits of tobacco and slave-trading. Street names such as Blackboy Hill and Whiteladies Road remain as reminders." However, common knowledge that both Whiteladies Road and Blackboy Hill had connections with the slave trade is untrue; both names are derived from pubs.

"It's a past that we feel equivocal about", says Steve Wright. "It's a double-edged thing. There are the beautiful Georgian terraces that we love, but they were built on the profits of slavery. It's our shady past, and Bristolians are a bit self-effacing, a bit ashamed of it and are quite keen to layer new associations on top of it. There's always been a defiant, subversive streak in Bristol, and Banksy's work is very much in that tradition."

References

Bibliography
Chemam, Melissa (2019), Massive Attack: Out of the Comfort Zone, Tangent Books,

External links
 Hijack – Bristol's primary discussion forum for urban culture and music

Underground scene
British music history
Music in Bristol
1990s in British music
Graffiti in England
Trip hop